Cassini Glacier is a steep glacier between Goat Mountain and Bonne Glacier, descending northwest from Hobbs Ridge into Blue Glacier, in Victoria Land, Antarctica. One of a group of names in the area associated with surveying applied in 1993 by the New Zealand Geographic Board, it was named from the Cassini map projection, a cylindrical projection in which the cylinder is at right angles to the axis of the globe.

References
 

Glaciers of Victoria Land
Scott Coast